Max Margules (1856-1920) was a mathematician, physicist, and chemist. In 1877 he joined the Central Institute of Meteorology and Geodynamics (ZAMG) in Vienna as a volunteer. After two years he left Vienna to study in Berlin for a year. He returned to Vienna and received his PhD in Electrodynamics. During his doctoral studies he was a Privatdozent: an unpaid position, but one which allowed him to lecture students. Students' fees gave him some income.
Later, administration offered this teaching job to someone else after he refused to convert from Judaism to acquire the position, which ended his academic career. In 1882 he returned to ZAMG. During this time he focused on electro- and hydrodynamic problems. In his free time he studied physical and physico-chemical problems. The Duhem–Margules equation and the Margules' Gibbs free energy equation are examples of his free-time devotion. In 1900 his interest switched to meteorology and deployed his thermodynamic knowledge. This led to the Margules formula, a formula for characterizing the slope of a front.

In 1919 the Austrian Society for Meteorology awarded him the silver Hann Medal of Acknowledgement. Margules accepted the medal, but rejected the money. He rejected all attempts to make the last year of his life bearable. His small pension and the devaluation of the currency due to World War I led to a life in poverty. He contented himself with food coupons in the post World War I period. He developed hunger edema, which he refused to remedy and on the October 4, 1920 he died from starvation.

Today Julius von Hann, head of ZAMG in that time, and Max Margules are seen as theoretical pillars of meteorology.

Publications
Über die Schwingungen periodisch erwärmter Luft, in: Sbb. Wien, math. nat. Kl., Bd. 99, Abt. 2a, 1890
Luftbewegungen in einer rotierenden Sphäroidschale bei zonaler Druckverteilung, ibid., Bd. 101/02, Abt. 2a, 1892–93
Vergleichung der Barogramme von einigen Orten rings um Wien, in: Meteorolog. Z., Bd. 14, 1897
Material zum Studium der Druckverteilung und des Windes in NÖ, in: Jhb. der k. k. Centralanstalt für Meteorol. und Erdmagnetismus in Wien, NF, Bd. 35, 1900; Bd. 37, 1902
Temperaturstufen in NÖ im Winter 1898/99, ibid., Bd. 36, 1901
Über den Arbeitswert einer Luftdruckverteilung und die Erhaltung der Druckunterschiede, in: Denkschriften Wien, math.-nat. Kl., Bd. 73, 1901
Über rasche Erwärmungen, in: Meteorolog. Z., Bd. 20, 1903
Über Temperaturschwankungen auf hohen Bergen, ibid., Bd. 20, 1903
Über die Energie der Stürme, in: Jhb. der k. k. Centralanstalt für Meteorol. und Erdmagnetismus in Wien, NF, Bd. 42, 1905
Über Temperaturschichtung in stationär bewegter und in ruhender Luft, in: Meteorolog. Z., Hann-Bd., 1906
Über die Zusammensetzung der gesättigten Dämpfe von Mischungen. Sitzb. der math.-nat. Classe der kaiserlichen
Akademie der Wissenschaften Wien 104, 1885
Über die Änderung des vertikalen Temperaturgefälles durch Zusammendrückung oder Ausbreitung einer Luftmasse, ibid., Bd. 23, 1906
Zur Sturmtheorie, ibid., Bd. 23, 1906; etc.

Biography
Österreichisches Biographisches Lexikon ÖBL, S. 84f
Neue Deutsche Biographie NDB, Bd. 16, S. 169; Familienartikel, 170f
Exner, W., Max Margules. In: Meteorologische Zeitschrift 37, 1920
Gold, E., Dr. Max Margules. In: Nature, Vol. 106, Issue 2661, S. 286-287 (1920)
In honor contribution of Max Margules to thermodynamics. Journal of Phase Equilibria and Diffusion, Vol. 17, Nr. 1 / Jan. 1996. Springer, Boston
"Max Margules—A Cocktail of Meteorology and Thermodynamics",  Jaime Wisniak, Journal of Phase Equilibria Vol. 24 No. 2 2003, p103-109

External links
 Quotation of Margules on PSU website
 Life and work

References

19th-century Austrian people
Austrian meteorologists
Polish scientists
Jews from Galicia (Eastern Europe)
1856 births
1920 deaths